The Oakland Athletics' 1995 season was the team's 28th in Oakland, California. It was also the 95th season in franchise history. The team finished fourth in the American League West with a record of 67–77.

The Athletics, for a third consecutive year, found themselves mired in mediocrity. As had been the case in both 1993 and 1994, an average-to-poor offense (headlined by Mark McGwire, Rickey Henderson, and Rubén Sierra) was sabotaged by one of the league's worst pitching staffs. For a third consecutive season, no Athletics starter posted an earned run average (ERA) of less than 4.50; only one such starter, Todd Stottlemyre, managed to record double-digit wins in the strike-shortened campaign.

The Athletics, despite their weak pitching, managed to contend in the first half of the season. On July 1, a win over the division-leading California Angels brought them within 1.5 games of first place; it also ran their record to a surprising 34–28. As had been the case in 1994, the A's followed their surprising start with a prolonged slump; between July 2 and August 15, the team went only 13–28. The collapse, along with an Angels surge (the Angels went 30–11 over the same span) left the A's 17.5 games out of first place. As had also been the case in 1994, Oakland mounted a dramatic comeback; an Angels collapse, combined with a surge of their own, allowed them to pull within five games of first place on September 20. The September 20th victory would be their last, as Oakland lost each of the regular season's final nine games. They finished the campaign eleven games behind the AL West champion Seattle Mariners.

The Athletics' on-field mediocrity, however, contained a few bright spots. Mark McGwire clubbed 39 home runs in a mere 104 games; he would hit at least 50 in each of the four subsequent seasons. The 1995 season also saw the debut of future superstar Jason Giambi. Giambi, in his first major league season, batted .256 with six home runs in 54 games. Lastly, the season was Tony La Russa's last as Oakland's manager. He, along with most of the Athletics' assistant coaches, would join the St. Louis Cardinals in 1996.

Offseason
 November 8, 1994: José Ortiz was signed as an amateur free agent by the Athletics.

Regular season

Season standings

Record vs. opponents

Notable transactions
 April 8, 1995: Dave Stewart was signed as a free agent by the Athletics.
 April 11, 1995: Todd Stottlemyre was signed as a free agent by the Athletics.
 April 12, 1995: Mike Gallego was signed as a free agent by the Athletics.
 April 20, 1995: Brian Harper was signed as a free agent by the Athletics.
 June 1, 1995: Mark Bellhorn was drafted by the Athletics in the 2nd round of the 1995 Major League Baseball draft. Player signed June 24, 1995.
 July 28, 1995: Rubén Sierra and Jason Beverlin were traded by the Athletics to the New York Yankees for Danny Tartabull.
 August 21, 1995: Ron Darling was released by the Athletics.

Roster

Player stats

Batting

Starters by position
Note: Pos = Position; G = Games played; AB = At bats; H = Hits; Avg. = Batting average; HR = Home runs; RBI = Runs batted in

Other batters
Note: G = Games played; AB = At bats; H = Hits; Avg. = Batting average; HR = Home runs; RBI = Runs batted in

Pitching

Starting pitchers
Note: G = Games pitched; IP = Innings pitched; W = Wins; L = Losses; ERA = Earned run average; SO = Strikeouts

Other pitchers 
Note: G = Games pitched; IP = Innings pitched; W = Wins; L = Losses; ERA = Earned run average; SO = Strikeouts

Relief pitchers 
Note: G = Games pitched; W = Wins; L = Losses; SV = Saves; ERA = Earned run average; SO = Strikeouts

Awards and records
 Mark McGwire, Major League Record, Most Home Runs in a season in under 350 At-Bats (39)

Farm system 

LEAGUE CHAMPIONS: AZL Athletics

References

1995 Oakland Athletics at Baseball Reference
1995 Oakland Athletics at Baseball Almanac

Oakland Athletics seasons
Oakland Athletics season
Oak